Persons known by the epithet the Stout include:

 Æthelmær the Stout (died 1015), Anglo-Saxon ealdorman of the western provinces (present day south-western England)
 Olaf II of Norway, King of Norway
 Sigurd the Stout (c. 960-1014), Earl of Orkney

See also
 List of people known as the Fat

Lists of people by epithet